William Watson (19 April 1873 – 29 September 1929) was a Scottish footballer who played as a goalkeeper.

Career
Watson played club football for Dykehead, East Stirlingshire and Falkirk.

He made one appearance for Scotland in 1898; though largely raised in Shotts, Watson was born in north-east England, which should have disqualified him (and Ireland-born teammate James McKee) from being selected under the rules of the time.

References

1873 births
1929 deaths
Scottish footballers
English footballers
Footballers from South Shields
Sportspeople from Shotts
Footballers from North Lanarkshire
Scotland international footballers
Dykehead F.C. players
East Stirlingshire F.C. players
Falkirk F.C. players
Association football goalkeepers
Anglo-Scots